David Demarest may refer to:

David P. Demarest (1931 –2011), American academic
David Demarest (politician)
David Demarest (builder), (1811-1879), American builder of Old Spalding County Courthouse, Griffin, Georgia and other notable buildings